Richard Blund  was Archdeacon of Barnstaple from 1264 to 1265.

Notes

Archdeacons of Barnstaple

13th-century English clergy